Chinese Taipei is scheduled to compete in the 2017 Asian Winter Games in Sapporo and Obihiro, Japan from February 19 to 26. Chinese Taipei is scheduled to compete in all five sports (seven disciplines). The Chinese Taipei delegation consists of 41 athletes and 30 officials. This marks the nation's largest ever Asian Winter Games team in terms of athletes and officials sent.

Competitors
The following table lists the Chinese Taipei delegation per sport and gender.

Alpine skiing

Chinese Taipei's Alpine skiing team consists of three athletes (two men and one woman).

Men
Ho Ping-jui
Wu Meng-che

Woman
Huang Pei-chen

Biathlon

Chinese Taipei's biathlon team consists of one male athlete.

Man
Wang Yao-Yi

Curling

Chinese Taipei has entered a men's team. The team consists of five athletes.

Men's tournament

Randolph Shen – skip
Nicholas Hsu – third
Brendon Liu – second
Ting-Li Lin – lead
Steve Koo – alternate

Round-robin
Chinese Taipei has a bye in draw 2

Draw 1 
Saturday, February 18, 9:00

Draw 3
Sunday, February 19, 9:00

Draw 4
Monday, February 20, 13:30

Draw 5
Tuesday, February 21, 9:00

Draw 6
Tuesday, February 21, 18:00

Semifinals
Wednesday, February 22, 1:30

Bronze medal match
Thursday, February 23, 1:30

Chinese Taipei finishes in fourth place.

Figure skating

Chinese Taipei's figure skating team consists of three athletes (two men and one woman).

Singles

Ice hockey

Chinese Taipei has entered a men's team. The team will compete in the Division one. Chinese Taipei finished in second place (6th place overall) in division 1 of the competition.

Men's tournament

Chinese Taipei was represented by the following 20 athletes:

Huang Sheng-chun (G)
Liao Yu-cheng (G)
Ting Pang-keng (G)
Chang Hsing-han (D)
Chang Wei-ting (D)
Chao Yu-tung (D)
Huang Jen-hung (D)
Shen Yen-lin (D)
Yang Chang-lin (D)
Yang Hsiao-hao (D)
Chang Kai-hsiang (F)
Chang Tse-wei (F)
Chen Jui-tang (F)
Chiu Yi-wei (F)
Lin Hung-ju (F)
Lin Tzu-chieh (F)
Shen Yen-chin (F)
Tang Yi-cheng (F)
Weng To (F)
Yang Chang-hsing (F)

Legend
G– Goalie D = Defense-man F = Forward

Short track speed skating

Chinese Taipei's short track speed skating team consists of eight athletes (4 men and 4 women).

Men
Lin Chung-Chieh
Lin Xian-You
Su Jun-Peng
Tsai Chia-Wei

Women
Lin Yu-Tzu
Lu Chia-Tung
Wang Kuan-Ming
Yang Zih-Shian

Speed skating

Chinese Taipei's speed skating team consists of one male athlete.

Man

References

Nations at the 2017 Asian Winter Games
Chinese Taipei at the Asian Winter Games
2017 in Taiwanese sport